Admiral the Honourable Sir John Talbot GCB (c. 1769 – 7 July 1851) was a senior British Royal Navy officer who served in the French Revolutionary and Napoleonic Wars and was engaged in several prominent single ship actions, all of which were successful. Later, during the War of 1812, Talbot was engaged in blockading the Connecticut coast and following the war retired to his country seat, never returning to service.

During the latter engagement Talbot was badly wounded and was subsequently presented with a gold medal for his success.

Early life
Talbot was born in approximately 1769, the son of Richard and Margaret Talbot, of Malahide near Dublin. His mother became Baroness Talbot de Malahide in 1831, the title passing to his elder brothers Richard and subsequently James. A younger brother was Thomas Talbot, a Canadian politician of the early nineteenth century.

Talbot entered the Navy in 1784, joining Horatio Nelson's ship  in the West Indies. At the outbreak of the French Revolutionary Wars in 1793, Talbot was attached to  under Samuel Hood in the Mediterranean. Talbot sailed the captured Gloire to Britain, where he was promoted to commander and took over the sloop .

Post-captain

In August Talbot was promoted to post captain in the sixth rate  in which he remained for four years in the West Indies and English Channel. During this period he captured numerous enemy merchant ships. Eurydice was present at the Saint Marcou Islands for the Battle of the Îles Saint-Marcouf in 1798, although the lack of wind prevented her from engaging the French attackers.

On 10 November 1799 near Beachy Head she surprised a schooner L'Hirondelle from Calais (14 guns) Captain Pierre Merie Dugerdin attacking a British brig the Diana of Sunderland which was putting up fierce resistance. Eurydice went in pursuit of the Frenchman and along the way met up with HMS Snake, Captain Lewis after a short engagement the Snake succeeded in capturing the schooner.

In February 1805 Leander discovered the French frigate Ville de Milan and the British HMS Cleopatra, which the French ship had captured the day before. Both ships were badly damaged and as a result Leander was able to outrun them and capture them without a fight. For this success, Talbot was moved to the ship of the line  and then  in which he participated in the Dardanelles Operation under John Thomas Duckworth.

In February 1812, Victorious was dispatched to the Adriatic Sea, to intercept the French ship of the line Rivoli recently constructed at Venice. Talbot discovered the French ship with a small escort on her maiden voyage on 22 February and immediately engaged. The ensuing five-hour duel caused heavy casualties on both ships, including Talbot who was badly wounded in the head by a large splinter. When Rivoli surrendered, she was found to have 400 of her crew, approximately half, killed or wounded. Both battered ships were returned to Britain, where they were repaired and Rivoli rejoined the Royal Navy.

War of 1812
Talbot, recovered from his wound, was presented with a gold medal and in November 1812 took the repaired Victorious to the West Indies and then to the Eastern Seaboard of the United States during the opening months of the War of 1812. For the next two years Talbot cruised off New London, Connecticut, blockading the port and preventing its use by American shipping. In the summer of 1814, Victorious was sent north to defend the whalers of the Davis Strait in the Arctic from American privateers. During this service, Victorious was badly holed by a rock and was forced to return to Britain. With the end of the Napoleonic Wars, Victorious was paid off.

Retirement
Talbot never again took an active post in the Navy either at sea or on shore. In 1812 he had inherited Delvins plantation, Montserrat, West Indies (with 112 enslaved persons) from his great-uncle John Nugent, Lt.Governor of Tortola. He retired to his estate at Rhode Hill near Lyme Regis in Dorset and married Maria Julia Everard, daughter of James Everard Arundell, 9th Baron Arundell of Wardour, with whom he had two sons and five daughters. In 1815 he was made a Knight Commander of the Order of the Bath and in 1819 was promoted to rear-admiral. In 1836 he received £1599 13s 1d compensation for the 100 enslaved at Delvins who had been freed by the Abolition of Slavery in 1834. For the next thirty years, Talbot lived as a country gentleman, steadily advancing in rank until at his death in 1851 he was a full admiral and a Knight Grand Cross of the Order of the Bath.

See also

Notes

External links 

1769 births
1851 deaths
Royal Navy admirals
Knights Grand Cross of the Order of the Bath
Royal Navy personnel of the French Revolutionary Wars
Royal Navy personnel of the Napoleonic Wars
Younger sons of barons
People from Malahide